Ezra Parmenter (March 20, 1823 – January 31, 1883) was a Massachusetts politician who served in both branches of the Massachusetts legislature, as an overseer of the poor, bridge commissioner, a city councilor and as the thirteenth Mayor of Cambridge, Massachusetts.

Parmenter was born to William Parmenter and Mary (Parker) Parmenter on March 20, 1823.

See also
 1872 Massachusetts legislature
 1874 Massachusetts legislature
 1875 Massachusetts legislature

Notes

Mayors of Cambridge, Massachusetts
Massachusetts city council members
Members of the Massachusetts House of Representatives
Massachusetts state senators
1823 births
1873 deaths
19th-century American politicians